Carlo Laverda (7 January 1947) is a former Italian sprinter.

Biography
He won also two medals with the national relay team at the International athletics competitions. He has 7 caps in national team from 1965 to 1968.

National titles
Carlo Laverda has won 1 time the national championship.
1 win in the 4x100 metres relay (1969)

See also
 Italy national relay team

References

External links
 Carlo Laverda at Athletics Podium

1947 births
Living people
Italian male sprinters
Athletics competitors of Centro Sportivo Aeronautica Militare
Mediterranean Games gold medalists for Italy
Athletes (track and field) at the 1967 Mediterranean Games
Mediterranean Games medalists in athletics
Sportspeople from Vicenza